Semyon Grigorievich Zimin (1760, Zuevo - 1840) was a Russian entrepreneur and founder of the Zimin dynasty. He was born a serf owned by the landowner Ryumin.

He married Anastasia Grigorievna with whom he had five sons: Kipriyan, Ivan, Pavel, Nikita, Stepan. They all became involved in the family business.

Semyon travelled to Moscow three or four times a year, selling silk goods to wholesalers in Kitay-gorod, the main commercial district in Moscow.

References

1760 births
1840 deaths